Under Cover – Chapter One is the 117th release and first and so far only cover album by electronic group Tangerine Dream. It is the groups twenty-eighth major studio album and was released in December 2010. The idea for the album is said to have started in 2008 in Los Angeles. The band was touring in the west coast area at the time, and their promoter jokingly told the band they should cover top 40 hits. It grew into a bet and a full blown concept after careful consideration from the band. Information on the album started to circulate in early autumn, and it was made available for pre-order on the Eastgate Shop website in November. Although appearing on Madcap's Flaming Duty (2007) and appearing on the cover art and performing vocals on this release, vocalist Chris Hausl never became an official member of the group.

Track listing
"Precious" was made available for listening on the band's MySpace page on 16 December 2010. Previews for the whole album were made available on their official download site on 18 December 2010.

Personnel
Tangerine Dream
 Edgar Froese – composer, musician, backing vocals
 Bernhard Beibl – musician
 Iris Camaa – musician
 Thorsten Quaeschning – composer, musician, vocalist
 Linda Spa – musician, backing vocals
 Additional musicians
 Chris Hausl - vocals

References

External links
 MusicTAP review

2010 albums
Tangerine Dream albums
Covers albums